The yellow-footed flycatcher or yellow-footed alseonax (Muscicapa sethsmithi) is a species of bird in the family Muscicapidae.
It is found in Cameroon, Central African Republic, Republic of the Congo, Democratic Republic of the Congo, Equatorial Guinea, Gabon, Nigeria, and Uganda.
Its natural habitat is subtropical or tropical moist lowland forests.

References

yellow-footed flycatcher
Birds of the Gulf of Guinea
Birds of Central Africa
yellow-footed flycatcher
Taxonomy articles created by Polbot